"Cruel Summer" is a song by English girl group Bananarama. It was written by Bananarama and Steve Jolley, Tony Swain, and produced by Jolley and Swain. Released in 1983, it was initially a stand-alone single but was subsequently included on their self-titled second album a year later. The song reached number eight on the UK Singles Chart in 1983, and after its inclusion in the 1984 film The Karate Kid, it reached number nine on the US Billboard Hot 100.

Bananarama singer Sara Dallin said the song "played on the darker side (of summer songs): it looked at the oppressive heat, the misery of wanting to be with someone as the summer ticked by. We've all been there!" It was ranked number 44 on VH1's 100 Greatest Songs of the '80s. Billboard named the song number 13 on their list of the "100 Greatest Girl Group Songs of All Time".

History
"Cruel Summer" was an immediate success when it was released in the UK, reaching number eight on the UK Singles Chart, and the group performed the song live on the BBC's Top of the Pops in July 1983. Its international popularity soared after its inclusion in the 1984 feature film The Karate Kid; this was a year after the song's original release (the song was released in 1984 in the US). The group did not allow the song to be included on the film's soundtrack album, but it still reached number nine in the US, their first top-10 hit there. When Bananarama were still struggling to make money in their early years, they even performed the song at a beauty contest in Hawaii. The song's biggest chart success was in South Africa, where it peaked at number three.

The song has since been revived in various forms. It has appeared in several television commercials, and was covered by other acts, such as Ace of Base, who scored an international hit with it (their version reached gold in the US). Blestenation sampled and remixed the song to make their own, also named "Cruel Summer" but with interspersed rap lyrics and altered structure; there are two edits of this song, one of which appeared on the 2002 Blue Crush soundtrack.

Since the original release of the song, Bananarama recorded another three versions. "Cruel Summer '89" was released in 1989, and given a new jack swing makeover, featuring Dallin and Woodward's vocals as a duo for the first time. It reached number 19 on the UK singles chart in June. This version was not included on any Bananarama album until 2005's Really Saying Something: The Platinum Collection. Another version of the song was recorded and featured on their 2001 album Exotica. This version featured Latin instrumentation and additional lyrics, but it was not released as a single. They released another updated version in 2009, as a B-side of their single "Love Comes".

The song was also featured as the theme tune of the first series of Trouble's reality show of the same name, where a group of young adults was sent off to a holiday camp, only to be tortured and humiliated in an attempt to win a large sum of money.

Music video
The music video was directed by Brian Simmons, and shot primarily in the Dumbo section of New York City's Brooklyn borough in the mid-1983. It opens with a shot of Manhattan in the background including the World Trade Center.

"[It] was just an excuse to get us to the fabled city of New York for the first time," Siobhan Fahey has said. She recalled the shoot, conducted during a heatwave, as a difficult experience. "It was August, over one hundred degrees. Our HQ was a tavern under the Brooklyn Bridge, which had a ladies' room with a chipped mirror where we had to do our makeup."

After an exhausting morning shooting in the city in brutal August heat, the band returned to the tavern for lunch. They made the acquaintance of some local dockworkers, who, upon learning of their situation, shared vials of cocaine with them. "That was our lunch," said Fahey, who had never tried the drug before. "When you watch that video, we look really tired and miserable in the scenes we shot before lunch, and then the after-lunch shots are all euphoric and manic."

The music video for the 1989 remix was a compilation of different shots from Bananarama's earlier videoclips. Notably missing are clips from the original 1983 video. Fahey is only featured in a pair of frames. Bananarama were unable to record a proper video for the song, because they were in the middle of a world tour at the time of its release.

Track listings
 7-inch vinyl single
 "Cruel Summer" (Album Version) 3:35
 "Cruel Summer" (Summer Dub Edited) 3:30

 12-inch vinyl single
 "Cruel Summer" (Extended Version) 4:55
 "Cruel Summer" (Summer Dub) 5:15
 "Cairo" 3:15

"Cruel Summer '89"
 UK CD single
 "Cruel Summer '89" (Swing Beat Version) 3:22
 Remixed by Blacksmith
 Also available from CD the albums The Works, Now That's What I Call Music 15 and Really Saying Something: The Platinum Collection.
 "Venus" (The Greatest Remix Edit) 3:42
 Remixed by Phil Harding & Ian Curnow
 "I Heard a Rumour" (Corporation of Bananarama Remix) 5:44
 Remixed by Freddy Bastone

 Japanese 3-inch CD single
 "Cruel Summer '89" (Swing Beat Dub) 5:20
 Remixed by Blacksmith
 Also available from the CD albums The Greatest Remixes Collection and The Very Best of Bananarama.
 "I Heard a Rumour" (Corporation of Bananarama Remix) 5:44
 Remixed by Freddy Bastone
 "Venus" (The Greatest Remix) 7:57
 Remixed by Phil Harding and Ian Curnow

Personnel
 Sara Dallin – vocals
 Keren Woodward – vocals
 Siobhan Fahey – vocals

Charts

Weekly charts
Original version

"Cruel Summer '89"

Year-end charts
Original version

Certifications

Ace of Base version

In 1998, Swedish pop group Ace of Base recorded the song at the request of their German and American record labels PolyGram and Arista Records. It was released as the second single from their third album, Flowers (1998), and as the lead single from the American version of the album titled Cruel Summer. A different "dancier" version of the song (known as the Big Bonus mix on the album), produced by Stephen Hague, Jonas "Joker" Berggren, Ulf "Buddha" Ekberg, and Johnny Jam & Delgado, was released on mainland Europe. The original album version, produced by Cutfather & Joe, was released in North America and UK.

"Cruel Summer" reached number 10 on the US Billboard Hot 100 and was certified gold. In the United Kingdom, the song reached number eight on the UK Singles Chart, matching the peak of the original Bananarama version. It also became Ace of Base's final Top 10 single in the US and UK.

Critical reception
Quentin Harrison of Albumism described the song as an "engaging cover" in his retrospective review of Flowers, and added that "one variant is closer to the originating take, albeit with a spike of hip-hop flavor for a bit of modish spunk", while "the second rendition is a surprisingly danceable, Spanish flecked trip." AllMusic editor Stephen Thomas Erlewine said it is "the melodic high point" of the Cruel Summer album. Larry Flick from Billboard wrote that "the act that gave the such ABBA-esque ditties as "All That She Wants" and "The Sign" turns its attention toward Bananarama, faithfully covering one of that group's bigger '80s-era hits. Producers Cutfather & Joe bring a few new rhythm ideas to the table dropping the tempo to a jeep-inspired funk beat and injecting an ear-tickling keyboard twist or two. However, the vocals hold few surprises, which is exactly what fans of both Ace Of Base and the original recording will want. In all, a potential smash that could keep this Swedish quartet on the front burner of top 40 radio for much of the summer." Kelly Pickerel from Daily Kent Stater said she liked this remake better than Bananarama's original, noting that "it’s also one of those songs you can never get out of your head as soon as you hear it".

Chuck Campbell from The Daily News noted it as a "slick-but-faithful remake". A reviewer from Entertainment Weekly commented that "it's clear what Ace of Base Svengali Jonas Berggren is aiming for — the iridescent sonic symmetry of Swedish forebears ABBA. A pretty lofty ambition. But he and his seraphic singing sisters, Linn and Jenny, actually attain ABBA's perfect pop-Euro-disco balance on this third outing. There isn't a note out of concordant place, no potential hook overlooked. Excepting the pointless title track, Berggren has done his homework. Just don't hate him because they sound so pretty." Evening Herald said it is a gem, adding "more of the same can often be a good thing". Swedish newspaper Expressen stated that the song "shows why Ace of Base once ruled the pop world". Gary Shipes from The Stuart News wrote in his review, that "the bubble-gum juvenilia of the original is replaced with updated hardware and a contemporary dance arrangement that launches the arc the rest of the CD will follow. At once melancoholic and jovial, the band's driving rhythmic force leaves no option but to fill dance floors on a dime."

Chart performance
"Cruel Summer" was successful on the charts in Europe, Canada and the US. In Europe, it made it to the top 10 in Hungary, on MTV's European Top 20 and in the United Kingdom. In the latter, the single peaked at number eight in its first week at the UK Singles Chart, on 4 October 1998. Additionally, it climbed into the top 20 in Scotland, as well as on the Eurochart Hot 100, where "Cruel Summer" reached its highest position as number 16. It was a top 30 hit in Austria, Belgium, Germany, Iceland and Switzerland. Outside Europe, it peaked at number two on the RPM Dance/Urban chart and number six on the RPM Top Singles chart in Canada, number 10 on both the Billboard Hot 100 and the Billboard Hot Dance Club Play chart in the United States. It earned a gold record in the US, with a sale of 500,000 singles.

Music video
A music video was filmed and directed by English director Nigel Dick. It was shot in Rome, Italy between 27 and 29 June 1998.
There are three versions of the video:
 "Cruel Summer"
 "Cruel Summer" (Big Bonus Mix)
 "Cruel Summer" (Frenglish version featuring Alliage)

The original video and the video using the Big Bonus Mix contain identical and similar footage, whereas the Frenglish version contains completely new footage. The Big Bonus Mix video was uploaded to YouTube in January 2015. As of August 2022, it had more than 17 million views on Youtube .

Track listings

 Scandinavian CD single
"Cruel Summer" (Big Bonus Mix) – 4:05
"Cruel Summer" (Cutfather & Joe Mix) – 3:33

 Scandinavian CD single
"Cruel Summer" (Big Bonus Mix) – 4:05
"Cruel Summer" (Cutfather & Joe Mix) – 3:33
"Cruel Summer" (Hartmann & Langhoff Radio Edit) – 3:23
"Cruel Summer" (Hartmann & Langhoff Club) – 7:45
"Into the Night of Blue" (bonus track) – 4:11

 Scandinavian CD single
"Cruel Summer" (KLM club Mix) – 10:27
"Cruel Summer" (Hani Num Club Mix) – 8:13
"Cruel Summer" (Soul Poets House Bust) – 3:40
"Cruel Summer" (Hartmann & Langhoff Club) – 7:45

 UK CD 1
 Cutfather and Joe Mix
 Big Bonus Mix
 Hartmann and Langhoff Short Mix
 Hartmann and Langhoff Club Mix

 UK CD 2
 "Cruel Summer" (Cutfather and Joe Mix)
 "Don't Turn Around" (The 7" Aswad Mix)
 "Beautiful Life" (Single Version)

 US maxi CD
 Album Version a.k.a. Cutfather and Joe Mix
 Hani Radio Mix a.k.a. Blazin' Rhythm Remix
 KLM Radio Mix
 Hani Num Club Mix
 KLM Club Mix

Charts

Weekly charts

Year-end charts

Sales and certifications

|}

Release history

Ace of Base and Alliage version

Ace of Base united with the French boy band Alliage and re-recorded as a duet in a release designed specifically for the French markets. It is bilingual in English and French with added lyrics to the original. The joint version peaked at number 24 on SNEP, the official French Singles Chart.

Rico Bernasconi vs. Ace of Base version

Rico Bernasconi released a remix EP with 8 remix versions of Ace of Base version of "Cruel Summer" which peaked at #69 in Germany.

Track listing
 "Cruel Summer (Screen Mix)" (3:19)
 "Cruel Summer (Tom Pulse Sunshine Radio Mix)" (3:00)
 "Cruel Summer (Original Club Mix)" (6:21)
 "Cruel Summer (Tom Pulse Sunshine Club Mix)" (5:24)
 "Cruel Summer (Max Farenthide Remix)" (5:48)
 "Cruel Summer (DJ Tom Cut Remix)" (5:26)
 "Cruel Summer (DJ Tomekk vs. Anady Club Remix)" (6:10)
 "Cruel Summer (Chris Galmon vs. Christopher GrEy Club Mix)" (6:13)

Notable cover versions
 Kari Kimmel's version of the song was recorded for season 2 of Cobra Kai and was released on its soundtrack album. It was used for the season's teaser trailer as well as being played at the end of the season finale, echoing the original song's use in the Karate Kid film which the show is a sequel to.
 Amy Lee and Troy McLawhorn of Evanescence recorded their version of the song at home during the COVID-19 pandemic for MagentaMusik 360.
 American alternative rock band Superchunk covered the song in 2012 as the B-side of their "This Summer" single.
 British artist Jessie Ware sampled the song for the track "Mirage (Don't Stop)" on her 4th studio album What's Your Pleasure?

Notes

References

External links
 
 

1983 singles
1984 singles
1998 singles
Bananarama songs
London Records singles
Mercury Records singles
PolyGram singles
Ace of Base songs
Mega Records singles
Disco songs
Music videos directed by Nigel Dick
Songs written by Sara Dallin
Songs written by Siobhan Fahey
Songs written by Keren Woodward
Songs written by Tony Swain (musician)
Songs written by Steve Jolley (songwriter)
Song recordings produced by Jolley & Swain
1982 songs
Songs about loneliness